The World Wide Web Consortium (W3C) is the main international standards organization for the World Wide Web. Founded in 1994 and led by Tim Berners-Lee, the consortium is made up of member organizations that maintain full-time staff working together in the development of standards for the World Wide Web. , W3C had 462 members. W3C also engages in education and outreach, develops software and serves as an open forum for discussion about the Web.

History

The World Wide Web Consortium (W3C) was founded in 1994 by Tim Berners-Lee after he left the European Organization for Nuclear Research (CERN) in October 1994. It was founded at the Massachusetts Institute of Technology (MIT) Laboratory for Computer Science with support from the European Commission, and the Defense Advanced Research Projects Agency, which had pioneered the ARPANET, one of the predecessors to the Internet. It was located in Technology Square until 2004, when it moved, with the MIT Computer Science and Artificial Intelligence Laboratory, to the Stata Center.

The organization tries to foster compatibility and agreement among industry members in the adoption of new standards defined by the W3C. Incompatible versions of HTML are offered by different vendors, causing inconsistency in how web pages are displayed. The consortium tries to get all those vendors to implement a set of core principles and components that are chosen by the consortium.

It was originally intended that CERN host the European branch of W3C; however, CERN wished to focus on particle physics, not information technology. In April 1995, the French Institute for Research in Computer Science and Automation became the European host of W3C, with Keio University Research Institute at SFC becoming the Asian host in September 1996. Starting in 1997, W3C created regional offices around the world. As of September 2009, it had eighteen World Offices covering Australia, the Benelux countries (Belgium, Netherlands and Luxembourg), Brazil, China, Finland, Germany, Austria, Greece, Hong Kong, Hungary, India, Israel, Italy, South Korea, Morocco, South Africa, Spain, Sweden, and, as of 2016, the United Kingdom and Ireland.

In October 2012, W3C convened a community of major web players and publishers to establish a MediaWiki wiki that seeks to document open web standards called the WebPlatform and WebPlatform Docs.

In January 2013, Beihang University became the Chinese host.

In 2022 the W3C  WebFonts Working Group won an Emmy Award from the National Academy of Television Arts and Sciences for standardizing font technology for custom downloadable fonts and typography for web and TV devices.

Specification maturation
W3C develops technical specifications for HTML5, CSS, SVG, WOFF, the Semantic Web stack, XML, and other technologies. Sometimes, when a specification becomes too large, it is split into independent modules that can mature at their own pace. Subsequent editions of a module or specification are known as levels and are denoted by the first integer in the title (e.g. CSS3 = Level 3). Subsequent revisions on each level are denoted by an integer following a decimal point (for example, CSS2.1 = Revision 1).

The W3C standard formation process is defined within the W3C process document, outlining four maturity levels through which each new standard or recommendation must progress.

Working draft (WD) 
After enough content has been gathered from 'editor drafts' and discussion, it may be published as a working draft (WD) for review by the community. A WD document is the first form of a standard that is publicly available. Commentary by virtually anyone is accepted, though no promises are made with regard to action on any particular element commented upon.

At this stage, the standard document may have significant differences from its final form. As such, anyone who implements WD standards should be ready to significantly modify their implementations as the standard matures.

Candidate recommendation (CR) 
A candidate recommendation is a version of a standard that is more mature than the WD. At this point, the group responsible for the standard is satisfied that the standard meets its goal. The purpose of the CR is to elicit aid from the development community as to how implementable the standard is.

The standard document may change further, but at this point, significant features are mostly decided. The design of those features can still change due to feedback from implementors.

Proposed recommendation (PR) 
A proposed recommendation is the version of a standard that has passed the prior two levels. The users of the standard provide input. At this stage, the document is submitted to the W3C Advisory Council for final approval.

While this step is important, it rarely causes any significant changes to a standard as it passes to the next phase.

W3C recommendation (REC) 
This is the most mature stage of development. At this point, the standard has undergone extensive review and testing, under both theoretical and practical conditions. The standard is now endorsed by the W3C, indicating its readiness for deployment to the public, and encouraging more widespread support among implementors and authors.

Recommendations can sometimes be implemented incorrectly, partially, or not at all, but many standards define two or more levels of conformance that developers must follow if they wish to label their product as W3C-compliant.

Later revisions 
A recommendation may be updated or extended by separately-published, non-technical errata or editor drafts until sufficient substantial edits accumulate for producing a new edition or level of the recommendation. Additionally, the W3C publishes various kinds of informative notes which are to be used as references.

Certification 
Unlike the Internet Society and other international standards bodies, the W3C does not have a certification program. The W3C has decided, for now, that it is not suitable to start such a program, owing to the risk of creating more drawbacks for the community than benefits.

Administration

The W3C has a staff team of 70–80 worldwide . W3C is run by a management team which allocates resources and designs strategy, led by CEO Jeffrey Jaffe (as of March 2010), former CTO of Novell. It also includes an advisory board that supports strategy and legal matters and helps resolve conflicts. The majority of standardization work is done by external experts in the W3C's various working groups.

Membership
The Consortium is governed by its membership. The list of members is available to the public. Members include businesses, nonprofit organizations, universities, governmental entities, and individuals.

Membership requirements are transparent except for one requirement: An application for membership must be reviewed and approved by the W3C. Many guidelines and requirements are stated in detail, but there is no final guideline about the process or standards by which membership might be finally approved or denied.

The cost of membership is given on a sliding scale, depending on the character of the organization applying and the country in which it is located. Countries are categorized by the World Bank's most recent grouping by gross national income per capita.

Criticism
In 2012 and 2013, the W3C started considering adding DRM-specific Encrypted Media Extensions (EME) to HTML5, which was criticised as being against the openness, interoperability, and vendor neutrality that distinguished websites built using only W3C standards from those requiring proprietary plug-ins like Flash. On 18 September 2017, the W3C published the EME specification as a recommendation, leading to the Electronic Frontier Foundation's resignation from W3C. As feared by the opponents of EME, none of the widely used Content Decryption Modules used with EME is available for licensing without a per-browser licensing fee.

Standards
W3C/Internet Engineering Task Force standards (over Internet protocol suite):

References

External links
 About the World Wide Web Consortium
 W3C Technical Reports and Publications
 W3C Process Document
 W3C History
 How to read W3C specs

1994 establishments in the United States
 
Internet Standard organizations
Organizations established in 1994
Organizations based in Cambridge, Massachusetts
Standards organizations in the United States
Technology consortia
Web development
Web services
Tim Berners-Lee